A beating net, also known as beating sheet, beat sheet or beating tray, is a device used to collect insects. It consists of a white cloth stretched out on a circular or rectangular frame which may be dismantled for transport. The beating tray is held under a tree or shrub and the foliage is then shaken or beaten with a stick. Insects fall from the plant and land on the cloth. They can then be examined or collected using a pooter.

The insect beating net was devised by George Carter Bignell.

References
Inventory Methods for Terrestrial Arthropods: Standards for Components of British Columbia's Biodiversity. No. 40. 1998  

Entomology equipment
Environmental Sampling Equipment